Robinson Crusoe or long titled Robinson Crusoe on Rainbow Island was a musical written by Australian actor and theatre manager Victor Prince, with music supplied by Australian composers Herbert De Pinna and Bert Rache. The show was first produced in 1917 by Victor Prince in the lead role in partnership with the Fuller brothers theatre circuit. The dialogue manuscript is lost, but many of the songs remain preserved. The original production had a successful run of 112 consecutive nights at the Grand Opera House, Sydney.

Characters
The cast reformed at each revival, but the main selection are these actors.
 Nellie Fallon was an attraction as principal girl Pollie Perkins 
 Drag King Nellie Kolle played the principal boy Will Atkins.
 Demon of the Deep - an octopus king played by Lou Vernon
 Chorus line of Sea nymphs to dance the harlequinade.
 Pirate King - Charles Zoll 
 Old Dame Crusoe - played by Walter Carnack
Friday and Saturday - Played by comedy duo Vaude and Verne (Troop entertainers Charles Vaude and Will Verne)
 Marom Erickson and three others played native islanders

Synopsis
Robinson Crusoe arrives home with a treasure map. On the voyage to hunt for the treasure, the party is sunk and marooned on a distant island. The octopus king stirs up the natives to repel the intrusion. Crusoe is rescued by the principal boy and all ends happily.

Song numbers
 Rainbow land - music by Herbert de Pinna 
 Kewpie's parade : two step - by Reg. A.A. Stoneham
 Oh! Mr. Robinson Crusoe - by Marsh Little
 Loves Sweet Dream - by Reg. A.A. Stoneham
 The demon of the deep / words and music by Reginald A.A. Stoneham 
 Moonlight surfing / words & music by Herbert de Pinna
 The girls are after me  by Herbert de Pinna
 The rainbow isle / written and composed by Reg. A.A. Stoneham

Critical Reception
The show was favourably mentioned by critics.

References

1924 musicals
Teen musicals
Musicals based on novels
Pantomime
Plays set in the 18th century
Australian musicals